Blémerey is the name of the following communes in France:

 Blémerey, Meurthe-et-Moselle, in the Meurthe-et-Moselle department
 Blémerey, Vosges, in the Vosges department